The 2002–03 Bulgarian Hockey League season was the 51st season of the Bulgarian Hockey League, the top level of ice hockey in Bulgaria. Four teams participated in the league, and HK Levski Sofia won the championship.

Regular season

Final 
 HK Levski Sofia - HK Slavia Sofia 4:2/3:2

External links
 Season on hockeyarchives.info

Bulgar
Bulgarian Hockey League seasons
Bulg